Parker's snake-necked turtle (Chelodina parkeri) is a species of turtle in the family Chelidae.

Taxonomy and etymology
The specific name parkeri, is in honor of Australian naturalist Fred Parker (born 1941). The species is the type species for the recently described subgenus Chelydera

Local Names
The Parker's snake-necked turtle is called kunkakta in the Suki and Arammba languages of southwestern Papua New Guinea.

Geographic range
Chelodina parkeri is endemic to the Fly River area of Western Province, Papua New Guinea.

References

Further reading
Rhodin AGJ, Mittermeier RA (1976). "Chelodina parkeri, A New Species of Chelid Turtle from New Guinea, with a Discussion of Chelodina siebenrocki Werner, 1901". Bull. Mus. Comp. Zool. 147 (11): 465–488. (Chelodina parkeri, new species, pp. 477–486).

External links

Turtles of New Guinea
Chelydera
Reptiles described in 1976
Taxonomy articles created by Polbot
Endemic fauna of Papua New Guinea